On 7 July 2014, it was announced by the New Zealand Rugby Union that the Māori All Blacks would play a three-match Asian Series, including two matches against the Japanese national team and a match against an invitational Asian Pacific Barbarians (APB) team - a side made up from top Asian and Polynesian players and coached by Tana Umaga. The APB match was set to take place at the newly opened National Stadium in Singapore, but due to concerns over the safety of the playing surface at the stadium, the match was cancelled on 21 October 2014. For Japan, the second a third meeting between the two teams goes ahead a scheduled with the 2013 tour coach Colin Cooper remaining as head coach.

Matches

First match

Second match

Asian Pacific Barbarians

Squads
Note: Caps, ages and clubs are to 1 November, pre first match.

Māori All Blacks
New Zealand Māori 27-man squad for the 2014 Japanese November Tour was announced on 21 October.

On 26 October, Nick Crosswell, Mitch Crosswell and Hayden Triggs were added to the squad to replace the injured Shane Christie, Liam Squire and Joe Wheeler respectively.

Japan
Japanese 30-man squad for two uncapped matches against the Māori All Blacks.

Statistics
Key
Con: Conversions
Pen: Penalties
DG: Drop goals
Pts: Points

Māori All Blacks player statistics

Match statistics

References

2014 rugby union tours
2014
2014
2014–15 in Japanese rugby union
2014 in New Zealand rugby union